Mohamadou Sadissou Bako or Sadissou Bako or Bako Sadissou, (born February 28, 1976 in Yaoundé, Cameroon) is a Cameroonian football player and manager who plays as a central striker. He retired in the end of 2010-11 season after played for PS Bengkulu with 3 goals in 11 appearances. He currently as caretaker manager for Persih Tembilahan after previously worked as an assistant coach for Raja Faisal.

Honours

Individual
2001 Liga Indonesia Premier Division Topgoalscorer : 22 goals

Career

Cameroon
The ex-Tonnerre striker who is on break in Yaounde he cited François Omam-Biyik as his mentor insinuating that his dream is to one day put on the national colours and defend his beloved fatherland as his standard-bearer did.

Indonesia
He got to Indonesia, the 1.8 m tall striker gratified veteran Maboang Kessack of Indomitable Lions’ fame who he described as his "personal manager" for teaching him certain techniques and charting the course for his professional football in Indonesia. He started his career in Indonesia with played for PSB Bogor after that in a row he played for PSMS Medan, Persita Tangerang, Persipura Jayapura, Persema Malang, Barito Putera, Persih Tembilahan and PS Bengkulu.

In 2001 Sadissou Bako who plays for division one side, Barito Putera closed the season as the highest goal scorer in the Indonesian premiership with a treasurer of 22 goals.

In the end of 2010-11 season after played for PS Bengkulu. Over all he scored 72 goals in Indonesian football competition.

In 2011-12 season he started his managerial career as an assistant coach of the club Persih Tembilahan, before he replaced the head coach and served as caretaker coach. In his debut as coach, his team defeated by a score of 0-2 of the Persis Solo.

Personal life
His brother is also a professional footballer named Muhamadou Tassiou Bako currently playing for Madura United.

References

External links
 Bako Sadissou at liga-Indonesia.co.id

1976 births
Living people
Cameroonian footballers
Association football forwards
Persipura Jayapura players
Cameroonian expatriate footballers
Expatriate footballers in Indonesia
Expatriate football managers in Indonesia
Cameroonian expatriate sportspeople in Indonesia
Persih Tembilahan
Cameroonian football managers
PSMS Medan players
Footballers from Yaoundé
Cameroonian expatriate football managers